The Qalandariyyah, Qalandaris, Qalandars or Kalandars are wandering ascetic Sufi dervishes. The term covers a variety of sects, not centrally organized and may not be connected to a specific tariqat. One was founded by Qalandar Yusuf al-Andalusi of Andalusia, Spain. They were mostly in Iran, Central Asia, India and Pakistan.

Starting in the early 12th century, the movement gained popularity in Greater Khorasan and neighbouring regions, including South Asia. The first references are found in the 11th-century prose text Qalandarname (The Tale of the Kalandar) attributed to Ansarī Harawī.  The term Qalandariyyat (the Qalandar condition) appears to be first applied by Sanai Ghaznavi (died 1131) in seminal poetic works where diverse practices are described. Particular to the qalandar genre of poetry are terms that refer to gambling, games, intoxicants and Nazar ila'l-murd, themes commonly referred to as kufriyyat or kharabat. The genre was further developed by poets such as Fakhr-al-Din Iraqi and Farid al-Din Attar.

Origin
The Qalandariyya are an unorthodox tariqa of Sufi dervishes that originated in medieval al-Andalus as an answer to the state sponsored Zahirism of the Almohad Caliphate. From there they quickly spread into North Africa, the Mashriq, Greater Iran, Central Asia and Pakistan.

Qalandariyya in South Asia

The Qalandariya may have arisen from the earlier Malamatiyya and exhibited some Buddhist and Hindu influences in South Asia. The Malamatiya condemned the use of drugs and dressed only in blankets or in hip-length hairshirts. Bu Ali Shah Qalandar was an important Indian qalandar. It spread to Hazrat Pandua in Bengal through the efforts of Shah Shafi ad-Din.

The writings of qalandars were not a mere celebration of libertinism, but antinomial practices of affirmation from negative action. The order was often viewed suspiciously by authorities.

The term remains in popular culture. Sufi qawwali singers the Sabri brothers and international Qawwali star Nusrat Fateh Ali Khan favoured the chant dam a dam masta qalandar (with every breath ecstatic Qalandar!), and a similar refrain appeared in a hit song from Runa Laila from movie Ek Se Badhkar Ek that became a dancefloor crossover hit in the 1970s.

In Pakistan and North India, descendants of Qalandariyah faqirs now form a distinct community, known as the Qalandar biradari.

Dhamaal
Songs honoring famous qalandars are called qalandri dhamaal in Pakistan. Dhamaal are a popular South Asian musical subgenre about Sufi saints such as Lal Shahbaz Qalandar. These songs typically incorporate qawwali styles as well as different local folk styles, such as bhangra and intense naqareh or dhol drumming.

See also
 Ashurkhana
 Jamatkhana
 Imambargah
 Khalwatkhana
 Khanaqa
 Mejlis
 Musallah
 Hussainia
 Tekkes
 Malamatiyya
 Mawlawiyyah
 Hurufiyya   
 Rifa'iyya
 Qadiriyya
 Galibi Order
 Bektashiyyah
 Naqshbandiyyah
 Zahediyya
 Khalwatiyya
 Bayramiyya 
 Safaviyya 
 Qalandar

Bibliography 
 De Bruijn, The Qalandariyyat in Persian Mystical Poetry from Sana'i, in The Heritage of Sufism, 2003. 
 Ashk Dahlén, The Holy Fool in Medieval Islam: The Qalandariyat of Fakhr al-din Araqi, Orientalia Suecana, vol.52, 2004.

References 

Shia Sufi orders